Several ships have been named New York City, including:

, a Los Angeles-class submarine

Five ships operated by Bristol City Line:
, sold in 1885 to the New York City Steamship Co, London
, sold to Turkey in 1950.
, ex Empire Camp and Valacia. Purchased in 1951 and sold to Glasgow United Shipping Co Ltd in 1955.
, sold to Leopard Shipping Co in 1968.

See also
List of ships named City of New York
List of ships named New York

 

Ship names
ships named New York City